After Marcuse is an Australian television film. It stars Diane Craig, Penne Hackforth-Jones, and Grigor Taylor.

Cast
Diane Craig as Liz
Penne Hackforth-Jones as Gillian
Grigor Taylor as Warren
David Whitney as Paul
Paul Mason as Laurence
Jim Kemp as Ron
Muriel Hopkins as Helen
Carmen Warrington as Kate
Anna Phillips as Sally Tate
Margaret Maddock as Elly

References

External links

After Marcuse at Screen Australia
After Marcuse at Austlit
After Marcuse at BFI

Australian drama television films
1988 television films
1988 films
1988 drama films
Films directed by Ted Robinson (TV director)
1980s English-language films